Munari is an Italian surname. Notable people with the surname include:

Atílio Munari (1901–1941), Brazilian palaeontologist
Bruno Munari (1907–1998), Italian artist
Claudine Munari (born 1954), Republic of the Congo politician
Cristoforo Munari (1667–1720), Italian painter
Dennis Munari (born 1948), Australian footballer
Gianni Munari (born 1983), Italian footballer
Sandro Munari (born 1940), Italian racing driver
Ulisse Munari (born 1960), Italian astronomer

See also
7599 Munari, a main-belt asteroid

Italian-language surnames